The 1994 Los Angeles Open was a men's tennis tournament held on outdoor hardcourts  in Los Angeles, California in the United States that was part of the World Series category of the 1994 ATP Tour. It was the 68th edition of the tournament and was held from August 1, 1994 through August 8, 1995. Second-seeded Boris Becker won the singles title.

Finals

Singles
 Boris Becker defeated  Mark Woodforde 6–2, 6–2
 It was Becker's 2nd singles title of the year and the 40th of his career.

Doubles
 John Fitzgerald /  Mark Woodforde defeated  Scott Davis /  Brian MacPhie 4–6, 6–2, 6–0

References

External links
 ITF tournament edition details

Los Angeles Open
Los Angeles Open (tennis)
Los Angeles Open
Los Angeles Open
Los Angeles Open